Phostria varialis is a moth in the family Crambidae. It is found in Brazil (Amazon region) and Costa Rica.

References

Moths described in 1862
Phostria
Moths of Central America
Moths of South America